Epiblema lasiovalva is a species of moth of the family Tortricidae. It is found in India (Jammu and Kashmir).

The ground colour of the forewings is dirty cream, the dorsal interfascia distinctly suffused with brownish grey in the dorsal half of the wing, along the costa and in the proximal part of the ocellus. The hindwings are brown.

References

External links

Moths described in 2006
Moths of Asia
Eucosmini
Taxa named by Józef Razowski